Arbeideren ("The Worker") was a Norwegian newspaper, published in Oslo.

Arbeideren was started in 1884 as an organ for the bourgeois trade union center Det norske Arbeiderforbund. It changed its name to Arbeiderstandens Fellesorgan ("Common Organ of the Worker Estate") in 1889. From 1906 until it went defunct in 1917, Arbeideren was the main organ of the newly established Labour Democrats with C. W. Asp as editor-in-chief.

References

1884 establishments in Norway
1917 disestablishments in Norway
Defunct newspapers published in Norway
Newspapers published in Oslo
Norwegian-language newspapers
Newspapers established in 1884
Publications disestablished in 1917
Radical People's Party (Norway) newspapers